Hasel Qubi, also known as Hasel Qui, may refer to:
 Hasel Qubi-ye Afshar
 Hasel Qubi-ye Amirabad